Nidularium catarinense is a plant species in the genus Nidularium. This species is endemic to Brazil.

References

catarinense
Flora of Brazil